Yuniel Hernández Solar (born 28 March 1981) is a Cuban hurdler.

His personal best time is 13.26 seconds, achieved in July 2001 in Salamanca when he was still only 20 years old. The result places him sixth (joint with Erik Batte) among Cuban 110 m hurdlers, behind Anier García, Dayron Robles, Emilio Valle, Alejandro Casañas and Yoel Hernández.

Personal bests
Outdoor
200 m: 21.24 s (wind: +1.2 m/s) –  Havana, 18 March 2005
110 m hurdles: 13.26 s (wind: +0.6 m/s) –  Salamanca, 18 March 2005
Indoor
50 m hurdles: 6.56 s –  Stuttgart, 4 February 2001
60 m hurdles: 7.54 s –  Pireás, 20 February 2002

Achievements

References

External links
 
 
 Tilastopaja biography

1981 births
Living people
Cuban male hurdlers
Olympic male hurdlers
Athletes (track and field) at the 2003 Pan American Games
Athletes (track and field) at the 2004 Summer Olympics
Olympic athletes of Cuba
Pan American Games medalists in athletics (track and field)
Pan American Games gold medalists for Cuba
Medalists at the 2003 Pan American Games
People from Artemisa Province
21st-century Cuban people